Nonlabens is a Gram-negative, strictly aerobic, non-spore-forming and non-motile genus of bacteria from the family of Flavobacteriaceae.

References

Flavobacteria
Bacteria genera
Taxa described in 2005